The 1927 Southern Conference football season was the college football games played by the member schools of the Southern Conference as part of the 1927 college football season. The season began on September 17. Games were permitted after Thanksgiving for the first time in the conference.

Georgia's "dream and wonder team" was deemed the national champion by some selectors (the Boand System and Poling System), even though it was upset 12–0 in the rain at the end of the season by would-be SoCon champion Georgia Tech. Prior to the game, Georgia was ranked #1 by the authoritative Dickinson System.

Coach Robert Neyland's Tennessee and Jack McDowall-led North Carolina State also posted undefeated conference records and had claims to conference titles.

Vanderbilt back Jimmy Armistead led the nation in scoring with 138 points, in no small part due to quarterback Bill Spears. One fellow wrote Vanderbilt produced "almost certainly the legit top Heisman candidate in Spears, if there had been a Heisman Trophy to award in 1927."

After Florida had an unexpected loss to Davidson, captain Frank Oosterhoudt was declared ineligible, and replaced at captain by Bill Middlekauff. With Middlekauff at captain, Florida suffered its only further losses to powers Georgia and NC State.

Ole Miss won the first Egg Bowl with a trophy in 1927, led by players Ap Applewhite, Sollie Cohen and V. K. Smith. Clemson hired Josh Cody.

Season overview

Results and team statistics

Key

PPG = Average of points scored per game
PAG = Average of points allowed per game

Regular season

SoCon teams in bold.

Week One

Week Two

Week Three

Week Four

Week Five

Week Six

Week Seven

Week Eight

Week Nine

Week Ten

Week Eleven

Week Twelve

Awards and honors

All-Americans

E – Tom Nash, Georgia (AP-3; UP-3; COL-1; INS; NANA; HE-1; DJW-1; BE-3; LP-1; AAB)
E – Chick Shiver, Georgia (AP-1; UP-1; NEA; CP-2; HE-2; DJW-3; NYS-1; BE-1; LP-2)
T – Fred Pickhard, Alabama (UP-2; CP-2)
G – John Barnhill, Tennessee (AP-2)
G – Gene Smith, Georgia (AP-3)
C – Elvin Butcher, Tennessee (DJW-2)
QB – Bill Spears, Vanderbilt (AP-1; UP-2; INS; NANA; CP-2; HE-3; DJW-1; LP-2)
FB – Herdis McCrary, Georgia  (AP-2; UP-2; HE-3; DJW-2)

All-Southern team

The following includes the composite All-Southern team compiled by the ''Associated Press.

See also
1927 Georgia vs. Yale football game

References